Belarus competed at the 1998 Winter Olympics in Nagano, Japan.

Medalists

Alpine skiing

Men

Biathlon

Men

Men's 4 × 7.5 km relay

Women

Women's 4 × 7.5 km relay

 1 A penalty loop of 150 metres had to be skied per missed target.
 2 One minute added per missed target.

Cross-country skiing

Men

1 Starting delay based on 10 km results.
C = Classical style, F = Freestyle

Men's 4 × 10 km relay

Women

2 Starting delay based on 5 km results.
C = Classical style, F = Freestyle

Women's 4 × 5 km relay

Figure skating

Ice Dancing

Freestyle skiing

Men

Women

Ice hockey

Men's tournament
The Belorussian hockey team was put into the preliminaries for the Olympics. They won their group that featured Germany, France and Japan by beating France 4-0, Germany 8-2 and by drawing Japan 2-2. Their first place helped them to play in the final tournament. They were in group A and lost all 3 games 5-0 to Canada and identical scores of 5-2 to Sweden and the United States. They finished last of group A and had to face the top spot in group B which was Russia. They lost 4-1 and got eliminated in the process from the tournament. They ended the tournament in 7th place.

Preliminary round – group B
Top team (shaded) advanced to the first round.

First Round – group C

Quarter-final

Nordic combined 

Men's individual

Events:
 normal hill ski jumping
 15 km cross-country skiing

Ski jumping

Speed skating

Men

Women

Trivia 
In a video game released that was related to the Olympic Hockey tournament, Belarus was represented with the Pahonia flag and with the national anthem of the former Soviet Union.

External links 
 Medal winners
 Hockey tournament

References
Official Olympic Reports
International Olympic Committee results database
 Olympic Winter Games 1998, full results by sports-reference.com

Nations at the 1998 Winter Olympics
1998
Olympics